Bijirud Kol (also Romanized as Bījīrūd Kol; also known as Bejīr Kol) is a village in Chukam Rural District, Khomam District, Rasht County, Gilan Province, Iran. At the 2006 census, its population was 326, in 90 families.

References 

Populated places in Rasht County